Flesinoxan (DU-29,373) is a potent and selective 5-HT1A receptor partial/near-full agonist of the phenylpiperazine class. Originally developed as a potential antihypertensive drug, flesinoxan was later found to possess antidepressant and anxiolytic effects in animal tests. As a result, it was investigated in several small human pilot studies for the treatment of major depressive disorder, and was found to have robust effectiveness and very good tolerability. However, due to "management decisions", the development of flesinoxan was stopped and it was not pursued any further.

In patients, flesinoxan enhances REM sleep latency, decreases body temperature, and increases ACTH, cortisol, prolactin, and growth hormone secretion.

See also 
 8-OH-DPAT
 Befiradol
 Buspirone
 Eptapirone

References

External links 

Serotonin receptor agonists
Eltoprazines
Benzamides
Fluoroarenes
Primary alcohols